A Fairy Tale After All is a 2022 American musical fantasy film produced, written and directed by Erik Peter Carlson. The film stars Emily Shenaut, Brian Hull, Gabriel Burrafato, Bridget Winder, Timothy N. Kopacz, and Anna Brisbin. The film was released theatrical and VOD by Vertical Entertainment on February 18, 2022.

Premise
A high school teenager named Sky (Emily Shenaut) is magically transported to the fairy tale kingdom of Celestia, where the villagers know her as Princess Geneva. She immediately finds herself on a daring journey to rescue her father, the King (Gabriel Burrafato), from the evil forces of Madame Mizrabel (Bridget Winder) and her slapstick sidekicks.

Cast
 Brian Hull as Thumpkin (voice)
 Lucie Jones as Handmaiden (voice)
 Anna Brisbin as Gargantuan Squabby (voice)
 Gabriel Burrafato as Geneva's Father / The King
 Bridget Winder as Madame Mizrabel
 Amy Morse as Sky's Mother
 Emily Shenaut as Princess Geneva / Sky
 Tobin Cleary as Braxton
 Chelsi Hardcastle as Princess Geneva / Sky (singing voice)
 Timothy N. Kopacz as Cornelis
 Faye Giordano as Young Sky
 Hayley Emin as Narrator / Chickpea / Cassidy Lemon
 Sophier Dryer as Peasant Child
 Zachary Brown as Cubby (voice)
 Shane Carlson as Hoglet #1
 Charles Merrihew as The Shroud
 Phillip Nathaniel Freeman as Master Willow (voice)
 Kate Maloy as Ms. Murphy
 Robby Devillez as Hektor (voice)
 Dante Burrafato as Tree Boy
 Shadia Hrichi as Chickpea (human)

Production
In June 2021, Premiere Entertainment Group announced they purchased Erik Peter Carlson's Labyrinth-inspired musical fantasy film A Fairy Tale After All, starring Emily Shenaut, Brian Hull, Gabriel Burrafato, Bridget Winder, Timothy N. Kopacz, and Anna Brisbin in lead roles. In July 2021, the production studios were revealed to be A Fairy Tale After All Enterprises and Riding Hood Motion Pictures. The film's music and lyrics were composed by Chelsi Hardcastle.

Release
A Fairy Tale After All was released simultaneously in theaters and VOD by Vertical Entertainment on February 18, 2022.

Critical reception
Ferdosa Abdi of Screen Rant rated the film 3 out of 5, writing "The blend of animation, black and white cinematography, and other techniques express Sky's emotional journey and offer viewers a boundless adventure".

References

External links
 
 

2020s coming-of-age films
2020s English-language films
2020s fantasy adventure films
2020s musical films
2022 fantasy films
2022 films
American coming-of-age films
American fantasy adventure films
American musical fantasy films
Puppet films
Films set in castles
Vertical Entertainment films
2020s American films